The British Independent Film Award for Best Performance by an Actress in a British Independent Film is an annual award given by the British Independent Film Awards (BIFA) to recognize the best leading performance by an actress in a British independent film. The award was first presented in the 1998 ceremony with Kathy Burke being the first recipient of the award for her performance as Valerie in Nil by Mouth.

With two wins each, Carey Mulligan and Olivia Colman are the only nominees who have won more than once. Samantha Morton holds the record of most nominations with five, followed by Judi Dench with four.

On July 2022, it was announced that the performance categories would be replaced with gender-neutral categories, with both Best Actor and Best Actress merging into the Best Lead Performance category. Additionally, a category named Best Joint Lead Performance was created for "two (or exceptionally three) performances that are the joint focus of the film, especially where performances share a large number of scenes and screen time".

Winners and nominees

1990s

2000s

2010s

2020s

Multiple nominations

5 nominations
 Samantha Morton

4 nominations
 Judi Dench

3 nominations
 Emily Watson
 Kate Ashfield
 Sally Hawkins
 Andrea Riseborough
 Carey Mulligan

2 nominations
 Rachel Griffiths
 Rachel Weisz
 Saoirse Ronan
 Keira Knightley
 Tilda Swinton
 Scarlett Johansson
 Olivia Colman
 Alicia Vikander
 Jessie Buckley

Multiple wins

2 wins
 Carey Mulligan (consecutive)
 Olivia Colman

See also
 Academy Award for Best Actress
 Critics' Choice Movie Award for Best Actress
 BAFTA Award for Best Actress in a Leading Role
 Golden Globe Award for Best Actress in a Motion Picture – Drama
 Golden Globe Award for Best Actress – Motion Picture Comedy or Musical
 Screen Actors Guild Award for Outstanding Performance by a Female Actor in a Leading Role

References

External links
 Official website

British Independent Film Awards
Film awards for lead actress